MacNaughton Mountain is a mountain located in Essex County, New York, named after James MacNaughton (1851–1905), the grandson of Archibald McIntyre. 
The mountain is part of the Street Range of the Adirondack Mountains.

The western slopes and north end of MacNaughton Mountain drain into Preston Ponds and Duck Hole pond, the source of the Cold River, which drains into the Raquette River, the Saint Lawrence River in Canada, and into the Gulf of Saint Lawrence.
The eastern slopes and south end of MacNaughton Mtn. drain into the southern Indian Pass Brook, thence into Henderson Lake, the source of the Hudson River, and into New York Bay.

MacNaughton Mountain is within the High Peaks Wilderness Area of New York's Adirondack Park.

According to the 1953 survey, the mountain did reach that height, while four of the 46 peaks on the list fell short. However, the list was kept the same because those were the original 46.
Since then, a survey has measured the elevation at exactly .

Because it is not one of the officially recognized Adirondack High Peaks and it does not offer notable views, MacNaughton is not climbed as frequently as many other mountains. There is no maintained trail or clear herd path for most of the climb from the end of the nearest trail at Wallface Pond.

See also 
 List of mountains in New York
 Northeast 111 4,000-footers 
 Adirondack High Peaks
 Adirondack Forty-Sixers

References

External links 
  Peakbagger.com: MacNaughton Mountain
  Summitpost.org: MacNaughton Mountain
 

Mountains of Essex County, New York
Mountains of New York (state)